Oye Lucky! Lucky Oye!   is a 2008 Indian comedy film starring Abhay Deol, Paresh Rawal, Neetu Chandra, Manu Rishi, Manjot Singh and Archana Puran Singh. It was directed by Dibakar Banerjee. The film won the National Film Award for Best Popular Film. The film is inspired by the real life shenanigans of Devinder Singh alias Bunty, a real-life "super-chor", originally from Vikaspuri, Delhi.

Plot
A boy from a poor, dysfunctional family from suburban West Delhi grows up to become a charismatic and fearless man who robs the elite of several major cities in India in a unique fashion, often not out of necessity, but just for fun. After being arrested by Special Crime Branch Inspector Devender Singh, Lovinder ‘Lucky’ Singh reflects upon his life: his childhood, his father's second marriage, his siblings; his entry into crime and association with Gogi Arora; his romance with and subsequent marriage with the lovely Sonal; and his subsequent betrayal by his hanger-on and a business partner. Meanwhile, the media speculates on how he got away with stealing 140 TV sets, 212 Video cassette recorders, 475 shirts, 90 music systems, 50 jewellery boxes, 2 dogs, and a greeting card – in a spree of burglaries that included households in Bangalore, Chandigarh, Mumbai, and other cities in India.

Cast
 Abhay Deol as Lovinder 'Lucky' Singh / Sunny Arora
 Paresh Rawal as Lucky's Father / Gogi Arora / Dr. B. D. Handa (lookalikes triple roles)
 Neetu Chandra as Sonal
 Manu Rishi as Bangali
 Richa Chadha as Dolly
 Archana Puran Singh as Kamlesh Handa
 Anurag Arora as Inspector Devender Singh / Yuvraj
 Manjot Singh as the Young Lovinder ‘Lucky’ Singh
 Kamlesh Gill as Chaai Ji (Chadha's Mother)

Soundtrack

Reception

Critical reception
Oye Lucky! Lucky Oye! received positive critical acclaim. Raja Sen of Rediff gave it 4.5/5 stars, saying that "All I can say is – after very gratefully handing it four and a half stars, in case you asked – that this is a movie to love. And one that makes the audience feel just like the hero: really, really lucky." Naresh K. Deoshi of Apun Ka Choice gave the movie 3.5/5 stars, concluding that "Grab a ticket. If you're broke, steal it." Nikhat Kazmi of Times of India gave the movie 3.5/5 stars, commenting that "Oye Lucky! Lucky Oye! works perfectly as a simple story of a young boy (Abhay Deol) who is driven to crime not because he is hungry, poor, starving." Syed Firdaus Ashraf of Rediff gave 3/5 stars, concluding that "The film only fails in the music department, by Sneha Khanwalkar. The dhols and drums get too loud from time to time, and get very annoying. If you can overlook this minor discomfort, go for it!" Rajeev Masand of CNN-IBN gave 3/5 stars, stating that "Watch it because it's a film that respects your intelligence. And films like that are hard to find."

Sonia Chopra of Sify gave it 2.5/5 stars, saying that "Writer-director Dibakar Banerjee cannot live down the expectations Khosla Ka Ghosla brings with it. Banerjee does meet those expectations, however Oye Lucky! is a different product altogether. More than a beginning-middle-end story, Oye Lucky! is more a peek into Delhi's belly, into the characters' lives, and into complex bitter-sweet relationships." Martin D'Souza of Glamsham gave 2.5/5 stars, concluding that "A film with a feel of the eighties, OLLO will identify well with the viewers from the North. But yes, if you want a quiet, funny outing to lighten your mood, watching OLLO is not a bad option." Taran Adarsh of Bollywood Hungama gave the movie 2/5 stars, saying that "On the whole, OYE LUCKY! LUCKY OYE! is a well-executed enterprise, which has its share of limitations. At the box-office, the film caters to the Northern audience mainly – Delhi and Punjab specifically. Besides North, the plexes in Mumbai should fare slightly better."

Box office
Oye Lucky! Lucky Oye! was an average grosser, with  nett in its lifetime, releasing two days after the 26/11 Mumbai attacks.

Production
Originally, Paresh Rawal was only approached by Dibakar Banerjee to play the role of Gogi. He was then convinced by the director to also take on the role of Dr. Handa, and finally the role of Lucky's father. Despite his initial hesitation to sport a beard in the role of Lucky's father, Paresh Rawal called working on this film the most satisfying experience of his career.

Awards

 2009: National Film Award
 Best Popular Film
 2009: Filmfare Award
 Critics Award for Best Actor: Manjot Singh
 Best Dialogue: Manu Rishi
 Best Costumes: Rushi Sharma / Manoshi Nath
 2009: IIFA Award
 Best Dialogue: Manu Rishi
 2009: Star Screen Award
 Best Story: Dibaker Banerjee: Nominated

References

External links
 

2000s Hindi-language films
2008 films
Films about con artists
Films set in Delhi
2000s crime comedy films
Films about organised crime in India
Films directed by Dibakar Banerjee
Films shot in Delhi
Films scored by Sneha Khanwalkar
UTV Motion Pictures films
Best Popular Film Providing Wholesome Entertainment National Film Award winners
2008 comedy films